Banco Chambers is a barristers' chambers in Sydney, Australia. The chambers was established in 2005 and the current head of chambers is Cameron Moore SC. Former members include Justin Gleeson SC, Solicitor-General of Australia.

Barristers
The floor has over 45 members of varying levels of seniority. The members of the floor who are senior counsel are: John Sheahan KC, Tom Blackburn SC, Peter Brereton SC, Robert Dick SC, Justin Gleeson SC, Richard McHugh SC, Cameron Moore SC, Robert Newlinds SC, Katherine Richardson SC, Ruth Higgins SC, Farid Assaf SC, Vanessa Whittaker SC, Kristen Deards SC, Tiffany Wong SC, Jonathon Redwood SC, James Emmett SC, Christopher Withers SC, Tim Breakspear SC, Anne Horvath SC, David Sulan SC and Nicholas Bender SC.

The chambers has been ranked in Band 1 for the Australian Bar in online magazine Chambers and Partners Guide to the World's Leading Lawyers. Individual members have received recognition in the practices of Dispute Resolution, Insolvency, Competition Law, Intellectual Property, Construction, and Taxation.

Members

Former members

 Fabian Gleeson SC, a justice of the New South Wales Court of Appeal and the Supreme Court of New South Wales
 Christine Adamson SC, a justice of the Supreme Court of New South Wales
 Simon Kerr SC
 Sandy Dawson SC

References

External links
 

Barristers' chambers
Companies based in Sydney